The 2005–06 Mid-American Conference women's basketball season began with practices in October 2005, followed by the start of the 2005–06 NCAA Division I women's basketball season in November. Conference play began in January 2006 and concluded in March 2006. Bowling Green won the regular season title with a record of 16–0 by one game over West Division champion Eastern Michigan. Lindsay Shearer of Kent State shared MAC player of the year.

Regular season champion Bowling Green won the MAC tournament over Kent State. Ali Mann of Bowling Green was the tournament MVP. Bowling Green lost to UCLA in the first of the NCAA tournament. Eastern Michigan played in the WNIT.

Preseason Awards 
The preseason poll was announced by the league office on October 26, 2005.

Preseason women's basketball poll 
(First place votes in parenthesis)

East Division 
  (17) 132
  (6) 117
  93
 Ohio 68
  40
  33

West Division 
  (20) 132
  (3) 99
  86
  83
  44
  39

Tournament Champion 
Bowling Green (15), Kent State (5), Eastern Michigan (4), Western Michigan (1)

Honors

Postseason

Mid–American Tournament

NCAA Tournament

Women's National Invitational Tournament

Postseason Awards 

Coach of the Year: Curt Miller, Bowling Green
Player of the Year: Lindsay Shearer, Kent State
Freshman of the Year: Rachel Frederick, Ohio
Defensive Player of the Year: Malika Willoughby, Kent State
Sixth Man of the Year: La'kia Stewart, Kent State

Honors

See also
2005–06 Mid-American Conference men's basketball season

References